Philip Davies (born 1972) is a British politician.

Philip Davies may also refer to:
Philip Davies (cricketer) (1893–1930), English cricketer
Philip Davies (British Army officer) (born 1932), British general
Philip R. Davies (1945–2018), biblical scholar
Philip Davies (priest) (1933–2005), Archdeacon of St Albans
Philip Davies (architectural historian) (born 1950), heritage and planning consultant
Phil Davies (politician), leader of Wirral Metropolitan Borough Council (2012–present)
Phil Davies (rugby union) (born 1963), Welsh rugby union footballer
Phil Davies (tennis), tennis player from Australia
Philippe Davies (born 1990), Canadian soccer player
Phill Davies (born 1981), English rugby union footballer
W. P. C. Davies (1928–2018), English rugby union player known as Phil Davies

See also
Philip Davis (disambiguation)